Jusuf Gazibegović (born 11 March 2000) is a Bosnian professional footballer who plays as a right-back for Austrian Bundesliga club Sturm Graz and the Bosnia and Herzegovina national team.

Gazibegović started his professional career at Red Bull Salzburg, who assigned him to Liefering in 2018. Two years later, he joined Sturm Graz.

A former youth international for Bosnia and Herzegovina, Gazibegović made his senior international debut in 2021.

Club career

Early career
Gazibegović started playing football at a local club Austria Salzburg, before joining youth academy of his hometown club Red Bull Salzburg in 2011. He made his professional debut playing for Red Bull Salzburg's feeder team, Liefering, against Ried on 3 March 2018 at the age of 17. In April 2019, he suffered a severe knee injury, which was diagnosed as anterior cruciate ligament tear and was ruled out for at least six months.

Sturm Graz
In September 2020, Gazibegović moved to Sturm Graz on a three-year deal. He made his official debut for the side on 4 October against Altach. On 9 February 2021, he scored his first professional goal against Ried, which secured the victory for his side.

In December 2022, he extended his contract until June 2026.

International career
Gazibegović represented Bosnia and Herzegovina at all youth levels. He also served as captain of the under-19 team under coach Toni Karačić.

In May 2021, he received his first senior call-up, for friendly games against Montenegro and Denmark. He debuted against the former on 2 June.

Career statistics

Club

International

References

External links

2000 births
Living people
Footballers from Salzburg
Austrian people of Bosnia and Herzegovina descent
Citizens of Bosnia and Herzegovina through descent
Bosnia and Herzegovina footballers
Bosnia and Herzegovina youth international footballers
Bosnia and Herzegovina under-21 international footballers
Bosnia and Herzegovina international footballers
Bosnia and Herzegovina expatriate footballers
Association football fullbacks
FC Red Bull Salzburg players
FC Liefering players
SK Sturm Graz players
2. Liga (Austria) players
Austrian Football Bundesliga players
Bosnia and Herzegovina expatriate sportspeople in Austria